The Down Junior Football Championship is an annual Gaelic football competition contested by lower-tier Down GAA clubs. The Down County Board of the Gaelic Athletic Association has organised it since 1920. The national media covers the competition.

Teconnaught are the title holders (2022) defeating Dromara in the Final.

History
In the 2016 final Drumgath held Teconnaught in what was a surprising result. Drumgath then had a landslide win in the replay to secure their first ever JFC crown.

Honours
The trophy presented to the winners is the ? The winners of the Down Junior Championship qualify to represent their county in the Ulster Junior Club Football Championship. The winners can, in turn, go on to play in the All-Ireland Junior Club Football Championship. Also, the winners of the Down Junior Championship automatically qualify for the following season's Intermediate Championship.

Finals listed by year
(r) = replay

Wins listed by club

References

Down GAA club championships
Junior Gaelic football county championships